The Nieuport 10 (or Nieuport XB in contemporary sources) was a French First World War sesquiplane that filled a wide variety of roles, including reconnaissance, fighter and trainer.

Design and development
In January 1914, designer Gustave Delage joined the Société Anonyme des Etablissements Nieuport, and started working on a series of aircraft that would remain in production for the remainder of the First World War. The Nieuport 10 was the first of these and was originally designed to compete in the Gordon Bennett Trophy race of 1914. World War I caused this contest to be cancelled, and the type was developed as a military two-seat reconnaissance aircraft that entered service in 1915.

The type featured a distinctive "V" strut layout. The lower wing was much smaller in area than the upper wing.  The concept was intended to combine the strength, compactness and stability of the biplane's wire braced wing cell with the speed and ease of handling of the monoplane.

Many were built or converted as single-seat fighters by covering the front cockpit, and adding a Lewis Gun or Vickers machine gun either to fire through the center section of the top wing or mounted over it, firing forwards. In this form, the type was used as a fighter.

Two major types were developed from the Nieuport 10 - the Nieuport 11 Bébé - a smaller aircraft, designed from the outset as a single-seater, and the Nieuport 12 - a more powerful two-seater with a larger top wing. In addition, production was undertaken of a dedicated trainer version under the Nieuport 83 E.2 designation with detail changes. A single example of a triplane, using a Nieuport 10 airframe was built to test an unusual staggered wing concept.

Operational use
Many of the early French aces flew the Nieuport 10, the best known of which was Georges Guynemer, who used several Nieuport 10s, all marked "Vieux Charles". Jan Olieslagers was flying a Nieuport 10 when he became the first Belgian to shoot down another aircraft, while the first Canadian aerial victory was also scored in a Nieuport 10, by Flight Sub-Lieutenant Arthur Ince.

Variants

Nieuport X.B
Early designation distinguishing it from the earlier unrelated Nieuport X monoplane.
Nieuport X.AV
Company designation with the observer/gunner seated in the front and the pilot in the rear.
Nieuport X.AR
Company designation with the pilot seated in the front and the observer/gunner in the rear.
Nieuport 10 A.2
Two-seat reconnaissance (Artillerie) aircraft, same as Nieuport X.AR.
Nieuport 10 C.1
Single-seat fighter variant. Inspired development of Nieuport 11 C.1.
Nieuport 10 E.2
Nieuport 10 A.2s used for training.
Nieuport 83 E.2
Purpose-built trainer with detail modifications.
Nieuport 10 triplane
Testbed for triplane with unusual wing stagger.
Nieuport-Macchi 10.000
Italian-built Nieuport 10 with many detail modifications.
Nieuport 18 or 18 meter Nieuport
Unofficial description of basic type based on nominal wing area of 18 square meters.
Nakajima Army Type 甲 2 (Ko 2) Trainer
Nieuport 83 E.2 built under licence in Japan.
Trainer Type 2
Siamese designation for imported Nieuport 83 E.2.

Operators

 Belgian Air Force

 Brazilian Air Force

Aéronautique Militaire
Aéronavale

 Finnish Air Force (ex-Russian examples) 
 Finnish Socialist Workers' Republic
Red Guards (ex-Russian examples)

 Corpo Aeronautico Militare

 Imperial Japanese Army Air Service

 Aeronáutica Militar Portuguesa - 7 Nieuport Ni.83E-2 trainers received in 1917.

 Romanian Air Corps - one Nieuport 10 purchased in 1915, used as trainer.

 Imperial Russian Air Service - imported large numbers and built under licence.
 Imperial Russian Navy - ex Air Service aircraft.
 
 Serbian Air Force

 Siam
Royal Siamese Aeronautical Service
  Ukrainian People's Republic
 Ukrainian People's Army (One aircraft only)

 Royal Naval Air Service - early user. Note that the Royal Flying Corps did not use the Nieuport 10.

 United States Air Service of the American Expeditionary Force - used as trainers only

Workers' and Peasants' Air Fleet (ex-Russian examples)

Survivors
Two Nieuport-Macchi 10,000's survive and are on display in Italy, one at the Museo Storico Italiano della Guerra and one at the Museo della Scienza e della Tecnologia "Leonardo da Vinci", and an original Nieuport 83 E.2 that had been flown by Charles Nungesser while barnstorming in the United States shortly after the First World War, is at Old Rhinebeck Aerodrome on static display.

Specifications (Nieuport-Macchi 10)

See also

References

Footnotes

Bibliography

 

1910s French fighter aircraft
Military aircraft of World War I
 010
1910s French military trainer aircraft
1910s French military reconnaissance aircraft
Sesquiplanes
Aircraft first flown in 1914
Single-engined tractor aircraft
Rotary-engined aircraft